Watching the World may refer to:

 A song by Chaka Khan
 A song by Mr. Mister
 An album and a song by Primary (band)